Alabama Ass Whuppin' is the title of the first Drive-By Truckers live album. It was recorded live in Athens and Atlanta in 1999. During the band's 2012 New Year's Eve rock show at the 9:30 Club in DC, it was announced that an expanded vinyl and CD release of the album was scheduled for 2013. A new version of the album was remastered and released on ATO Records in 2013.

Track listing
"Why Henry Drinks"
"Lookout Mountain"
"The Living Bubba"
"Too Much Sex (Too Little Jesus)"
"Don't Be in Love Around Me"
"18 Wheels of Love"
"The Avon Lady"
"Margo and Harold"
"Buttholeville"
"Steve McQueen"
"People Who Died" (Cover of The Jim Carroll Band)
"Love Like This"

Personnel
 Mike Cooley - guitars, lead and backing vocals
 Patterson Hood - guitars, lead and backing vocals
 Rob Malone - bass, backing vocals
 Brad Morgan - drums

References

Drive-By Truckers albums
2006 live albums
Country rock albums by American artists